Jinhong Yuan is an electrical engineer at the University of New South Wales in Sydney, Australia. He was named a Fellow of the Institute of Electrical and Electronics Engineers (IEEE) in 2016 for his contributions to multi-antenna wireless communication technologies.

References

Fellow Members of the IEEE
Academic staff of the University of New South Wales
Living people
Australian electrical engineers
Year of birth missing (living people)